The Great Privilege was an instrument signed by Mary of Burgundy on 11 February 1477, which reconfirmed a number of privileges to the States General of the Netherlands. Under this agreement, the provinces and towns of Flanders, Brabant, Hainaut, and Holland recovered all the local and communal rights which had been abolished by the decrees of the preceding dukes of Burgundy Charles the Bold and Philip the Good in their efforts to create a centralised state on the French model out of their separate holdings in the Low Countries.

Background

As Charles the Bold died unexpectedly on 5 January 1477, during the battle of Nancy, his daughter Mary of Burgundy became Duchess of Burgundy at the age of nineteen. At the time, her marriage to Maximilian I had not yet been solemnized, so she stood alone for the heavy task of defending the succession states against the various rulers of neighbouring countries. Mary's position was weak. Louis XI of France had taken Burgundy and Franche Comté and had also invaded Artois and Picardy following the death of Mary's father Charles the Bold. Among her own citizens there was great discontent, which did not make Mary's situation any easier. The Duchy of Guelders and the principality of Liège had already declared independence. On 3 February 1477, an urgent meeting of the States General was therefore convened. It appeared that the States were prepared to recognise and support Mary of Burgundy as their sovereign with financial resources, but only with the granting of various concessions.

The Great Privilege granted by Mary met a large part of the demands and complaints of the States. These came down to dissatisfaction with the centralised administration of the Burgundian Netherlands. The power of the central government had to be curtailed by a series of provisions while the power of the individual provinces had to be increased. After the enactment of the Grand Privilege the authority of Mary seemed restored. It appeared that during her trip through all the States of the Netherlands that each principality itself still had considerable needs. These individual needs were also met by Mary and became known as the land privileges.

Provisions
The main provisions were:
 The Parliament of Mechelen and the General Accounting Office were abolished
 A Great Council of 24 members was established to help Mary in the administration
 The particular customs of each of the regions were secured, so that the identity of the private law remained guaranteed.
 The duchess was not allowed to marry, to declare war or levy taxes without consent of the States
 Only residents of the own province may hold offices in the region, not outsiders
 Suspects may only in their own province come to court, no foreign judges
 The States may, at their own will be in session, anywhere and any time
 In the Dutch speaking provinces government letters had to be written in Dutch and not in French
 Restoration of the Accounting Office in The Hague

End
Many aspects of the Great Privilege were ignored as Mary's position strengthened. After the death of Mary in 1482, her husband Maximilian I, acting as guardian of her son Philip the Handsome, abolished the treaty. The Flemish cities revolted to maintain their autonomy, but ultimately failed in their attempts.

References
 , 1477 Het algemene en de gewestelijke privilegien van Maria van Bourgondie voor de Nederlanden (Standen en Landen, LXXX), Kortrijk - Heule, 1985. 
 , The formation and constitution of the Burgundian State (fifteenth and sixteenth centuries), in American historical review 14 (1909), pp. 477-502.

External links
 

Legal history of the Netherlands
15th century in the Netherlands
Treaties of the Burgundian Netherlands
Succession acts